Malekabad or Malikabad or Molkabad or Malkabad or Mallakabad may refer to:

Alborz Province
 Malekabad-e Hammanlu, a village in Savojbolagh County, Alborz Province, Iran

Chaharmahal and Bakhtiari Province
Malekabad, Kuhrang, a village in Kuhrang County
Malekabad, Bazoft, a village in Kuhrang County
Malekabad-e Yek, a village in Kuhrang County

Fars Province
Malekabad, Rostaq, a village in Darab County
Malekabad, Forg, a village in Darab County
Shahrak-e Malekabad, a village in Darab County
Malekabad, Jahrom, a village in Jahrom County
Malekabad, Marvdasht, a village in Marvdasht County
Malekabad, Arzhan, a village in Shiraz County
Malekabad, Shiraz, a village in Shiraz County

Kerman Province
 Malekabad, Anbarabad, a village in Anbarabad County
 Malekabad, Jiroft, a village in Jiroft County
 Malekabad, Kerman, a village in Kerman County
 Malekabad, Narmashir, a village in Narmashir County
 Malekabad, Rafsanjan, a village in Rafsanjan County
 Malekabad, Rigan, a village in Rigan County
 Malekabad, Sirjan, a village in Sirjan County
 Malekabad, Zarand, a village in Zarand County
 Malekabad Rural District, in Sirjan County

Kermanshah Province
 Malekabad, Kermanshah, a village in Sonqor County

Kohgiluyeh and Boyer-Ahmad Province
 Malekabad, Kohgiluyeh and Boyer-Ahmad, a village in Basht County

Kurdistan Province
 Malekabad, Kurdistan, a village in Qorveh County

Lorestan Province
 Malekabad, Aligudarz, a village in Aligudarz County
 Malekabad, Borujerd, a village in Borujerd County
 Malekabad, Delfan, a village in Delfan County
 Malekabad, Khorramabad, a village in Khorramabad County
 Malekabad, Zagheh, a village in Khorramabad County
 Malekabad, Qaleh-ye Mozaffari, a village in Selseleh County
 Malekabad, Yusefvand, a village in Selseleh County
 Malekabad-e Somaq, a village in Dowreh County

Markazi Province
 Malekabad, Arak, a village in Arak County, Markazi Province, Iran
 Malekabad, Saveh, a village in Saveh County, Markazi Province, Iran

Mazandaran Province
Malekabad-e Bala, a village in Sari County
Malekabad-e Pain, a village in Sari County

Qom Province
 Malekabad, Qom, a village in Qom Province, Iran

Razavi Khorasan Province
 Malekabad, Razavi Khorasan, a city in Iran
 Malekabad, Khoshab, a village in Khoshab County
 Malekabad, Rashtkhvar, a village in Rashtkhvar County
 Malekabad, Torbat-e Heydarieh, a village in Torbat-e Heydarieh County
 Malekabad, Torbat-e Jam, a village in Torbat-e Jam County

Sistan and Baluchestan Province
Malekabad, Bampur, a village in Bampur County
Malekabad, Dalgan, a village in Dalgan County
Malekabad, Iranshahr, a village in Iranshahr County
Malekabad, Eskelabad, a village in Khash County
Malekabad, Gowhar Kuh, a village in Khash County

South Khorasan Province
 Malekabad, Birjand, a village in Birjand County
 Malekabad, alternate name of Mobarakabad, South Khorasan, a village in Birjand County
 Malekabad, Qaen, a village in Qaen County

Tehran Province
 Malekabad, Tehran, a village in Eslamshahr County

West Azerbaijan Province
 Malekabad, West Azerbaijan, a village in Miandoab County

Yazd Province